The Nigerian Institute of Quantity Surveyors (NIQS) is the professional umbrella body for quantity surveyors in Nigeria.
It is one of the two major bodies associated with the profession in the country. The other is Quantity Surveyors Registration Board of Nigeria (QSRBN), which is the regulatory body of the quantity surveying profession and practice in Nigeria. It was established by Decree No. 31 of December 5, 1986, now CAP Q1 Laws of the Federation of Nigeria (LFN) 2004.

History
A group of Nigerians, trained in the UK, came back to the country and created a parallel body to the Royal institute of Chartered Surveyors of the United Kingdom.

In the United States of America, quantity surveyors are known as 'Cost Engineers.' The profession over the years has played some roles in the development of the countries infrastructure by advising government to be accountable 
the professional body has as her first President;	Chief G.A Balogun, PPNIQS, FNIQS, FRICS (1969-1973) and very recently, NIQS has a first female President;	Mrs. Mercy Torkwase Iyortyer, FNIQS, MAPS (2015- 2017)

Notable Quantity Surveyors in Nigeria
Mrs. Mercy Torkwase Iyortyer, FNIQS, MAPS 
 Nasir Ahmad el-Rufai 
Mohammed Munir Yakub, Deputy Governor, Katsina State 2015-2023
 Obafemi Onashile
 Michael Ama Nnachi, Nigerian Senator
 Bima Muhammad Enagi, Nigerian Senator

Chapters
Anambra State Chapter.
Kaduna State Chapter 
Ondo State Chapter 
Abia State Chapter 
Rivers State Chapter 
Adamawa State Chapter 
Akwa-Ibom State Chapter 
Bauchi State Chapter 
Bayelsa State Chapter 
Benue State Chapter 
Borno State Chapter 
Cross River State Chapter 
Delta State Chapter 
Ebonyi State Chapter 
Edo State Chapter 
Ekiti State Chapter 
Enugu State Chapter 
FCT Chapter 
Gombe State Chapter 
Imo State Chapter 
Jigawa State Chapter 
Kano State Chapter 
Katsina State Chapter 
Kogi State Chapter 
Kwara State Chapter 
Lagos State Chapter 
Nasarawa State Chapter 
Niger State Chapter

Events
The Nigerian Institute of Quantity Surveyors hold workshops across Nigeria annually. Previous events such as workshops, QS Job Fairs, End of The Year Dinner etc were held in Osun State, Gombe, Uyo, March, Kaduna, Makurdy, Abuja, Lagos etc. Other events are Biennial Conference/Election General Meetings and Annual General Meetings.

References

External links

Professional associations based in Nigeria
Surveyors
Quantity surveyors